The Wordy Shipmates is the fifth book by the American social commentator Sarah Vowell, published in October 2008. The book chronicles the 17th and 18th century history of Puritan colonists in Massachusetts, United States. The book delineates a dichotomy between the Puritans of the Massachusetts Bay Colony and those who settled in Plymouth, Massachusetts, by analysing several key historical events, like the Pequot War and the banishment of Roger Williams and Anne Hutchinson.

External links
Virginia Heffernan, "Mayflower Power" - book review in The New York Times (November 28, 2008)
Adam Woog, "Puritans' fervent theology becomes comically droll history lesson" - book review in The Seattle Times (October 13, 2008)
Book discussion on The Wordy Shipmates, C-SPAN, October 9, 2008

2008 non-fiction books
Books by Sarah Vowell
History books about the United States
Pre-statehood history of Massachusetts